The Chocolate Kiddies is a three-act Broadway-styled revue that, in its inaugural production – from May to September 1925 – toured Berlin, Hamburg, Stockholm, and Copenhagen. The show never actually performed on Broadway, but was conceived, assembled, and rehearsed there. Chocolate Kiddies commissioned new works, but was also an amalgamation and adaptation of several leading African American acts in New York, specifically Harlem, intended to showcase exemplary jazz and African American artistry of the Harlem Renaissance. Early jazz was uniquely American; and, while New Orleans enjoys popularity for being its birthplace, the jazz emerging from Harlem during the Renaissance had, on its own merits, captured international intrigue.

History 

The impetus for producing the Chocolate Kiddies was partly a culmination or outgrowth of (i) the success of a Harlem (and Atlantic City) jazz band led by Sam Wooding (1895–1985) and a floor show, initially developed for the 1923 opening of the Nest Club and (ii) the success of Eubie Blake and Noble Sissle's Broadway musical, The Chocolate Dandies, which, after 96 performances, closed November 22, 1924  leaving some of the cast available, from which, the Chocolate Kiddies picked up choreographer Charlie Davis and singer Lottie Gee. The cast included singer Adelaide Hall, who came from the Miller and Lyles Broadway production Runnin' Wild, The Three Eddies, Rufus Greenlee and Thaddeus Drayton, Bobbie and Babe Goins, Charles Davis and Sam Wooding and his Orchestra.

Leoni Leonidoff (né Leonid Davydovich Leonidoff-Bermann; born abt. 1886) became the owner-producer of the Chocolate Kiddies tour. He was a Russian-Jewish exile living in Berlin as a theatrical impresario.

Leonidoff's introduction to Wooding was possibly influenced by a Russian-Jewish-born American impresario living in New York, Morris Gest (1875–1942) and his brother and partner, Sam Gest (1889–1960), an impresario living in Berlin. Leonidoff, in 1925, signed Wooding to take his band on a European tour, provided that a musical revue was added.

Russian-born Jewish American impresario Arthur Seymour Lyons (1895–1964) staged an adaptation and, for several weeks prior to departure, rehearsed the company at Bryant Hall. Before settling on the name Chocolate Kiddies, the show had been billed as the Club Alabam Revue and Club Alabam Fantasies.

Duke Ellington, with Jo Trent as lyricist, composed four songs for the production – his first work for a musical revue genre.

1925 Departure 
After a farewell reception at the Bamville Club in Harlem two days earlier, over 500 theatrical professionals swarmed the White Star Line Pier (either Pier 59 or 60; current site of Chelsea Piers) on May 6, 1925, as Wooding, his band, and the revue performers boarded the SS Arabic and departed for Hamburg.

Members of the revue who did not travel aboard the SS Arabic included Helen Miles, Willie Robbins, Arthur Robbins, Ruth Williams, and Evelyn Dove, who traveled from London. Lottie Gee was aboard as Lottie Kyer – she had been married from 1913 to 1924 to pianist "Peaches" Kyer (né Wilson Harrison Kyer; 1888–1982).

Arrival and tour 
The company arrived in Hamburg May 17, 1925, and traveled to Berlin, arriving May 18 and opened May 25 at the Admiralspalast, where they performed 8 weeks. One of the audience members, -year-old Berliner Alfred Lion, later said, "It was the first time I saw colored musicians and heard the music. I was flabbergasted  – It was something brand new, but it registered with me right away."  Thirteen years later, in 1938, Lions co-founded Blue Note Records in New York. The Chocolate Kiddies Orchestra also did a recording sessions in Berlin June 5–10, 1925, at Vox Records.

On July 28, Chocolate Kiddies opened in Hamburg at the Thalia Theater for 32 performances, ending August 24. Then  Stockholm, opening August 25 and closing September 14. The Stockholm performances included a benefit for the Swedish Red Cross, for the brother of the King. Then they performed in Copenhagen in the Circus Building, opening September 15, closing September 25.

La Revue Nègre 1925 opening in Paris 
Hotsy Totsy, a tab dance revue backed by The Charleston Jazz Band, led by Claude Hopkins, renamed La Revue Nègre, opened in Paris October 2, 1925. The cast included Will Marion Cook and Josephine Baker. At least one Chocolate Kiddies cast member, Lydia Jones, joined the production.

Production personnel and cast

Production 
Book and staging:
 Arthur Seymour Lyons

Music:
 Joe Trent (né Joseph Hannibal Trent; 1892–1954), lyrics
 Duke Ellington, music
<li> "Deacon Jazz" – prior to the 1925 debut of the Chocolate Kiddies, Jo Trent and the Deacons recorded "Deacon Jazz" c. November 1924 in New York; Jo Trent (vocals); Otto Hardwick (C-melody sax); Duke Ellington (piano); George Francis (banjo); Sonny Greer (drums) – discographer Brian Rust lists Fred Guy on banjo; Matrix T-2007-1; Jazz Panorama JPLP12
 "Jig Walk," Charleston
 "Jim Dandy"
<li> "With You"

Orchestration:
 Arthur Johnston (1898–1954)

Choreographer:
 Charles Davis (né Charles Columbus Davis; 1894–1963) ‡

Set design and costumes:
 Willy Pogany (1882–1955)

Publisher:
  Robbins-Engel;

Cast 
Sam Wooding's Orchestra from Club Alabam

 Sam Wooding, piano, leader
<li> Willie Lewis (1905–1971), clarinet
 Eugene Sedric (1907–1963), clarinet, tenor sax
 
 Tommy Ladnier (1900–1939), trumpet
 Bobby Martin (1903–1983), trumpet
 Maceo Elmer Edwards (1900–1988), trumpet
 Herb Flemming (1898–1976), trombone
 John Warren, tuba
 Johnny Mitchell, banjo
 George Howe (1892–1936), drums

Huvudroller (Swedish)(leading roles):

 Greenlee & Drayton
 
 Thaddeus "Teddy" Drayton (1893–1964)
 The Three Eddies
 
 
 
 Leading roles (continued) Evelyn Dove (1902–1987)
 Margaret Sims (maiden 1903–1974)
 Bobby and Babe Goins(acrobatic dancers)
 
 
 Leading roles (continued)  
 Adelaide Hall (1901–1993)
 Lottie Gee (1886–1973)
 Charles Davis (1894–1963)
 George Staton (né George Franklin ; 1904–1967)
 
 Jessie Crawford
 Arabella Fields (1879–1931)
 Lydia Jones
 Helen Miles
 Ruth WilliamsPrisbelönta dansöser från New Yorks största Neger teatrar(Award Winning Dance Shows From New York's Greatest Black Theaters)

<li> 
 Viola ("Jap") Branch
 Pearl Brown
<li> 
 Thelma Green (1900–1990), wife of Rufus Greenlee
 
<li> Rita Walker (1905–1983)
<li> Thelma Watkins (maiden; 1906–1954)
 Mamie Savoy
 Bobbie Vincent (1906–1978)
 Arthur Robbins

Selected songs 
 From Act 1
 "Night Life in a Negro Cafe in Harlem in New York"
<li> "Deacon Jazz," sang by Adelaide Hall with chorus

 From Act 2
 "Symphonic Concert Jazz Concert by the Sam Wooding Orchestra of the Club Alabam, New York"
 
 
 
 
 
 
<li> 

 From Act 3
 "Jim Dandy," a strut dance
 "With You," sung by Lottie Gee
<li> "Jig Walk," Charleston, to which an ensemble danced the Charleston

Gallery 
While in Berlin, the band, recorded several selections for the Berlin-based Vox label.

Selected subsequent tours 
 1926 – Chocolate Kiddies 1926 Russian tour
 1927 – Sam Wooding and the Chocolate Kiddies, with much of the 1925 cast performed in Argentina in 1927 for six months, returning to New York December 3, 1927, aboard the Voltaire (de).
 1929 – Sam Wooding and His Orchestra, billed as the "Chocolate Kiddies Orchestra," toured Spain in 1929, without the chorus and dancers. They performed in San Sebastián, Madrid, and Barcelona. The tour has been chronicled as Spain's first live jazz performances by Americans. On July 3, 1929, while in Barcelona, the orchestra recorded ten songs for Parlophon. Eight of the songs were recorded twice, to accommodate different record formats.

 Musicians: Bobby Martin (1903–1983) (trumpet, vocals), Doc Cheatham (1905–1997) (trumpet, vocals, arranger), Albert Wynn (1907–1973) (trombone), Billy Burns (1904–1963) (trombone), Willie Lewis (1905–1971) (clarinet, alto sax, bari sax, vocals), Jerry Blake (1908–1961) (clarinet, alto sax, vocals), Gene Sedric (1907–1963) (clarinet, tenor sax, vocals), Freddy Johnson (1904–1961) (piano, vocals, arranger), Johnny Mitchell (banjo, guitar), Sumner Leslie "King" Edwards (1894–1957) (tuba, bass), Ted Fields (né Edward Fields; 1905–1959) (drums), Sam Wooding (director)

Bibliography
Williams, Iain Cameron Underneath a Harlem Moon: The Harlem to Paris Years of Adelaide Hall . Bloomsbury Publishers, . Chapter 6: The Chocolate Kiddies Come to Town - is devoted to the 1925 Chocolate Kiddies tour.

Bourne, Stephen Evelyn Dove: Britain's Black Cabaret Queen [Jacaranda Books, 2016] . Chapter 4: The Chocolate Kiddies.

Notes and references

Notes

References 

1920s in music
1920s-related lists
Harlem Renaissance
Harlem